Camille Leroy (27 April 1892 – 13 August 1952) was a Belgian racing cyclist. He rode in the 1921 Tour de France.

References

1892 births
1952 deaths
Belgian male cyclists
Place of birth missing